Franciscus Gerardus Petrus "Frans" Kellendonk (7 January 1951 – 15 February 1990) was a Dutch novelist and translator. In 1987 he won the Ferdinand Bordewijk Prijs for his novel Mystiek lichaam (Mystical Body).

Publication
 Franciscus Gerardus Petrus Kellendonk: John & Richard Marriott. The history of a seventeenth-century publishing house. Amsterdam, 1978. (Dissertation Katholieke Universiteit Nijmegen).

References 

 Frans Kellendonk

External links

 

1951 births
1990 deaths
Dutch male novelists
Dutch translators
Ferdinand Bordewijk Prize winners
Radboud University Nijmegen alumni
People from Nijmegen
Dutch gay writers
Dutch LGBT novelists
Gay novelists
AIDS-related deaths in the Netherlands
20th-century Dutch novelists
20th-century Dutch male writers
20th-century translators
20th-century Dutch LGBT people